SS Empire Tower was a British  cargo ship built in 1935 and sunk by enemy action in 1943.

She was built by the Burntisland Shipbuilding Company Ltd. in Fife, Scotland. The North Eastern Marine Engineering Co. Ltd. of Sunderland built her 335 NHP three-cylinder triple expansion steam engine. She was fitted with direction finding equipment.

She was launched as SS Roxburgh for B.J. Sutherland and Company of Newcastle-upon-Tyne. In 1937 the Tower Hill Steamship Company, an offshoot of Counties Ship Management, bought her and renamed her SS Tower Field.

Damage and repair
On 10 May 1941 Tower Field was steaming in ballast from London to Newcastle when a German aircraft attacked and damaged her off the Outer Dowsing Buoy in the Thames Estuary. She was repaired and returned to service.

On 19 October 1941 she was entering Workington Channel off Hull with a cargo of iron ore when she ran aground and fractured her hull. She broke in two but her cargo was discharged and she was refloated and repaired.

The Ministry of War Transport took her over and renamed her SS Empire Tower but kept her under CSM management. She returned to service in December 1942.

Sinking
Early in 1943 Empire Tower, under Captain David John Williams OBE, joined Convoy XK-2 from Gibraltar to the UK. Empire Tower sank within a minute and Captain Williams, six gunners and 35 crew were lost. The Royal Navy armed trawler  rescued three survivors and landed them at Londonderry, Northern Ireland.

References

1935 ships
Ships built in Scotland
Water transport in the United Kingdom
Ships of Counties Ship Management
Empire ships
Maritime incidents in October 1941
Maritime incidents in March 1943
Ships sunk by German submarines in World War II
Shipwrecks in the Atlantic Ocean